Mesapia is a genus of butterflies in the family Pieridae. It contains only one species, Mesapia peloria, the Tibet blackvein, which is found in India, Nepal and China. It is a mid-sized to large species.

Subspecies
M. p. epsteina Tadokoro, T, Koide, Y. & Hori, K., 2014 (Nepal, southern slope of Himalaya)
M. p. peloria (Kukunoor, Tsinghai)
M. p. grayi O. Bang-Haas, 1934 (Gansu)
M. p. leechi O. Bang-Haas, 1934 (western Sichuan)
M. p. tibetensis D'Abrera, 1990 (south-eastern Tibet)
M. p. minima Huang, 1998 (north-western Tibet: Xiangangjiang Mountains)

See also
Pieridae
List of butterflies of India
List of butterflies of India (Pieridae)

References

Further reading
 
 Tadokoro, T, Koide, Y. & Hori, K., 2014. Description of a new subspecies of Mesapia peloria from central Nepal, and taxonomic notes for other subspecies (Lepidoptera, Pieridae). Transactions of the Lepidopterological Society of Japan, 65(2): 51-59. abstract.

Pierini
Monotypic butterfly genera
Taxa named by George Robert Gray
Pieridae genera